The 2015 Pan American Race Walking Cup took place on May 9–10, 2015. The races were held on a 2 km circuit on Avenida Raúl Pey, Playa Chinchorro, in Arica, Chile.  A detailed report of the event was given for the IAAF.

Complete results were published.

The event also served as inaugural NACAC Race Walking Championships with a separate Women's 50 km competition.

Medallists

Race results

Men's 20km

†: Extra athlete not eligible for team points.

 Note: Athletes in parentheses did not score for the team result.  (n/s: nonscorer)

Men's 50km

†: Extra athlete not eligible for team points.

 Note: Athletes in parentheses did not score for the team result.  (n/s: nonscorer)

Men's 10km Junior (U20)

†: Extra athlete not eligible for team points.

 Note: Athletes in parentheses did not score for the team result.  (n/s: nonscorer)

Women's 20km

†: Extra athlete not eligible for team points.

 Note: Athletes in parentheses did not score for the team result.  (n/s: nonscorer)

Women's 10km Junior (U20)

†: Extra athlete not eligible for team points.

 Note: Athletes in parentheses did not score for the team result.  (n/s: nonscorer)

Medal table (unofficial)

 Note: Totals include both individual and team medals, with medals in the team competition counting as one medal.

Participation
According to an unofficial count, 152 athletes from 15 countries participated.

NACAC Race Walking Championships

Women's 50km

External links
 Official website (in Spanish)

References

Pan American Race Walking Cup
Pan American Race Walking Cup
International athletics competitions hosted by Chile
Pan American Race Walking Cup